Oxyrhachis is a genus of African plants in the grass family. The only known species is Oxyrhachis gracillima, native to Sierra Leone, Nigeria, Cameroon, Tanzania, Madagascar, KwaZulu-Natal, Cape Province.

References

Panicoideae
Flora of Africa
Monotypic Poaceae genera
Taxa named by John Gilbert Baker
Taxa named by Charles Edward Hubbard